CCCI may refer to:
 Campus Crusade for Christ International
 Central Criminal Court of Iraq
 Chittagong Chamber of Commerce & Industry
 Cleveland, Columbus, Cincinnati and Indianapolis Railway
 Compagnie du Congo pour le Commerce et l’Industrie

 301 in Roman numerals